Allison Walsh Kurian is an American medical oncologist. She is a Professor of Medicine and Epidemiology & Population Health at Stanford University and an oncologist at the Stanford Cancer Institute.

Early life and education
Kurian was born to two academic parents; Diana Chapman Walsh, the former President of Wellesley College, and Christopher T. Walsh, a biochemist at Harvard University. Kurian earned her Bachelor of Arts degree in Human Biology at Stanford University before earning her medical degree from Harvard Medical School. She completed her residency training in Internal Medicine at the Massachusetts General Hospital and her medical fellowship in Medical Oncology at Stanford University, where she was simultaneously earning a master's degree in Epidemiology.

Career
Upon completing her fellowship, Kurian accepted a research scholar position supported by a Building Interdisciplinary Research Careers in Women's Health K12 award. In her role as an instructor in the Division of Oncology at the Stanford Cancer Genetics Clinic, she partook in an international study focusing on experimental technology to bring higher resolution and fewer risks than mammography and magnetic resonance imaging. In March 2008, she was appointed an assistant professor of medicine and health research and policy at Stanford University. Her research focus was on identifying risk for breast and ovarian cancer. By July, she received  a Physician Faculty Scholars Award from the Robert Wood Johnson Foundation to fund her study, "Optimizing the use of breast cancer risk-reduction strategies by patients and physicians." Kurian and her research team discovered that models used to identify cancer risks in women worked better on white women than other ethnic groups. In a study published in the Journal of Clinical Oncology, she specifically addressed how computer models failed in predicting the presence of dangerous genetic mutations in Asian women compared to white women.

In 2011, Kurian collaborated with epidemiologist and biostatistician Alice S. Whittemore to examine how women related to patients of hereditary mutation breast cancer, but lacked the mutation themselves, were of no higher risk of getting cancer than relatives of patients with other types of breast cancer. The next year, she was appointed director of Stanford Women's Clinical Cancer Genetics Program and sat on the Advisory Committee for the California Health Care Foundation. In this role, she continued to research on the identification of women with elevated breast and gynecologic cancer risk and the development of new techniques for early cancer detection and risk reduction. This resulted in the development of an online tool that helps people with BRCA mutations make preventive care decisions. In 2014, she conducted a study with Scarlett Gomez which found that breast cancer patients who undergo bilateral mastectomy are not guaranteed better survival rates.

On December 1, 2015, Kurian was promoted to associate professor of medicine, health research, and policy. In this role, she collaborated with doctors at Emory University and the University of Michigan to study 83,000 women diagnosed with breast or ovarian cancer in California and Georgia between 2013 and 2014. The result of the study revealed that fewer than a quarter of the patients studied underwent genetic testing for cancer-associated mutations, thus highlighting gaps between national guidelines for testing and actual testing practices. In 2020, she was elected to the American Society for Clinical Investigation.

References

External links
 

Living people
American oncologists
Women oncologists
Stanford University alumni
Stanford University School of Medicine faculty
Harvard Medical School alumni
Members of the American Society for Clinical Investigation
Year of birth missing (living people)
Scientists from Boston